The 2020 NFL Draft was the 85th annual meeting of National Football League (NFL) franchises to select newly eligible players for the 2020 NFL season. The first round was held on April 23, followed by the second and third rounds on April 24. The draft concluded with rounds 4–7 on April 25. The NFL originally planned to hold the event live in Paradise, Nevada, before all public events related to it were canceled due to the COVID-19 pandemic. Instead, all team selections took place via videoconferencing with league commissioner Roger Goodell broadcasting picks from his home.

The Washington Redskins later changed their team name to the Washington Football Team just two months after this draft, making it the final draft where players were selected under the Redskins moniker.

This draft is noteworthy for producing one of the strongest quarterback classes in NFL history, with 5 Pro Bowlers, spearheaded by No. 1 overall pick Joe Burrow, followed by Tua Tagovailoa, Justin Herbert, Jalen Hurts and Tyler Huntley.

Format
The host city was chosen among finalists Denver, Kansas City, Las Vegas, Nashville, and Cleveland/Canton in May 2018 during the NFL Spring League Meeting, when Nashville was chosen to host the 2019 draft. However, the host city for 2020 was deferred. After Denver withdrew, citing scheduling conflicts, Las Vegas was chosen as the original host on December 12, 2018, coinciding with the Las Vegas Raiders' arrival in the city. Plans were announced for a main stage near the Caesars Forum convention center and a "red carpet" stage for arrivals on a floating platform in front of the Bellagio resort, with players being transported to and from the stage by boat. However, due to the COVID-19 pandemic, the NFL announced on March 16 that it had canceled all public festivities associated with the event.

Instead, the draft was held remotely, with team coaches and GMs convening via Microsoft Teams due to all team facilities also being closed. NFL commissioner Roger Goodell announced the picks for rounds 1–3 from his home in Bronxville, New York. During the event Goodell announced that Las Vegas would host the 2022 NFL Draft.

Player selections
The following is the breakdown of the 255 players selected by position:

 38 linebackers
 35 wide receivers
 27 cornerbacks
 20 defensive tackles
 20 offensive tackles
 20 safeties
 18 offensive guards
 18 running backs
 18 defensive ends
 13 quarterbacks
 12 tight ends
 9 centers
 3 placekickers
 2 punters
 1 long snapper
 1 safety/linebacker

 
{{NFLDraft-row |draftyear=2020 |round=2 |picknum=64 |team=Carolina Panthers |first=Jeremy |last=Chinn |position=S |collegeyear=2019 |college=Southern Illinois |collegeteam=Southern Illinois Salukis |collegelink=Southern Illinois |cfb page exists=yes |note=from Kansas City via Seattle {{refn|''No. 64: multiple trades.Kansas City → Seattle (PD). Kansas City traded a second-round selection along with 2019 first- and third-round selections to Seattle in exchange for a 2019 third-round selection and defensive end Frank Clark.Seattle → Carolina (D). Seattle traded a second-round selection (64th) to Carolina in exchange for third- and fifth-round selections (69th and 148th).|group="R2 -"}} |probowl=}}

Notable undrafted players

Trades within the draft

In the explanations below, (PD) indicates trades completed prior to the start of the draft (i.e. Pre-Draft), while (D) denotes trades that took place during the 2020 draft.Round oneRound twoRound threeRound fourRound fiveRound sixRound sevenForfeited picks

Notes

 Media coverage 
Coverage of all three days of the draft aired on ABC, ESPN, NFL Network, ESPN Deportes, and ESPN Radio. ESPN and NFL Network aired shared coverage of all three days hosted by Trey Wingo from ESPN's studios in Bristol, which was simulcast by ABC for the third day. Rece Davis, Jesse Palmer, and Maria Taylor, all from College GameDay, hosted ABC's telecasts for the first two days. Jennifer Hudson was announced to perform as part of a Draft Preshow on the first day, followed by Kelly Clarkson on the second day and OneRepublic on the third.

ESPN Deportes provided Spanish language coverage of the draft with Monday Night Football voices Eduardo Varela and Pablo Viruega. ESPN Radio's coverage featured host Dari Nowkhah from ESPN's SEC Network, former general manager Mike Tannenbaum, ESPN New York's Bart Scott (Thursday/Friday), NFL Draft analyst Jim Nagy (Saturday) and reporter Ian Fitzsimmons with updates from Marc Kestecher.

Summary
Selections by NCAA conference

Colleges with multiple draft selections

Selections by position

ReferencesTrade referencesGeneral references'''

National Football League Draft
Draft
NFL Draft
Events in Hartford County, Connecticut
NFL Draft
NFL Draft
Bristol, Connecticut
American football in Connecticut